Doctor Ecstaticus may refer to:

 Denis the Carthusian (1402 – 1471), Roman Catholic theologian and mystic
 Meister Eckhart (c. 1260–c. 1328), German theologian, philosopher and mystic
 John of Ruusbroec (1293–1381), Flemish mystical theologian